Dear Uge is a Philippine television comedy anthology broadcast by GMA Network. Starring Eugene Domingo and Divine Aucina, it premiered on February 14, 2016 on the network's Sunday Grande sa Hapon line up replacing Wowowin. In 2020, Domingo was now started to acting for her portrayal in different love stories and other issues in this show. Also, in 2021, as the show have a new format, it also releases new episodes starting May 30 and Domingo has a different special portraying personas.

Series overview

Episode list

2021

Notes

References

Lists of television episodes
Philippine television episodes